Appleton was a Canadian musical duo composed of sisters Natalie and Nicole Appleton. The sisters are better known as members of the girl group All Saints.

Biography
Natalie and Nicole Appleton were born in 1973 and 1974 respectively to their British mother Mary and their Canadian father, Ken. They also have two elder sisters, Lori and Lee. Their parents divorced in the late 1970s, and the sisters switched frequently between their mother's native United Kingdom, Canada, and the United States.  Both attended Ellenville High School in upstate New York. They stayed in Britain eventually, and became students at the Sylvia Young Theatre School in North London, which was to tutor their fellow All Saints colleague and Nic's schoolmate, Melanie Blatt as well as Denise van Outen, Emma Bunton, Letitia Dean and Samantha Janus. The sisters were back in the UK in 1994, and, together with Shaznay Lewis, joined with former schoolmate Melanie Blatt to form All Saints.

In 2000, both sisters appeared in the poorly received film Honest, directed by ex-Eurythmics member Dave Stewart. In 2001, All Saints disbanded.

Natalie and Nicole formed the band Appleton, and in September 2002, issued their first single "Fantasy", written with Andy Hayman and Gareth Young, which reached number 2 in the UK Singles Chart. Their autobiography, Together, came out in October 2002. The sisters releases stated that director David Slade announced he would direct the autobiographical book into a film, but that has yet to happen.

In 2003, they had two more hits with "Don't Worry" and "Everything Eventually" and the album, Everything's Eventual which went gold in the UK after just two months. They decided to sign a deal with Concept Music in late 2004 because of differences with their previous label, Polydor.

In 2004, Natalie appeared on I'm a Celebrity... Get Me Out of Here!. In 2007, Nicole was a presenter on the UK reality show Hell's Kitchen.

All Saints reformed in 2006; by then the Appleton enterprise had ceased.

Group members

Natalie Appleton
Natalie Appleton was born 14 May 1973 in Mississauga, Ontario, Canada and married Liam Howlett in June 2002. She has a daughter born in May 1992 and a son born in March 2004.

Nicole Appleton
Nicole Appleton was born 7 December 1974 in Hamilton, Ontario, Canada and was married to Liam Gallagher. They have a son who was born in July 2001.

Discography
 and All Saints discography
Everything's Eventual (2003)

References

Musical groups established in 2002
Musical groups disestablished in 2005
Musical groups from Hamilton, Ontario
Musical groups from Mississauga
Canadian pop music groups
Canadian girl groups
Sibling musical duos
Canadian musical duos
2002 establishments in Ontario
2003 disestablishments in Ontario
All Saints (group)
Canadian expatriates in England
Feminist musicians
Female musical duos